The Monk of Heilsbronn (german: Mönch von Heilsbronn) is the unknown author of some short mystical treatises, written about the beginning of the fourteenth century, at the Cistercian Abbey of Heilsbronn, in Bavaria.

The Monk cites St. Bonaventure and Albert the Great (d. 1280) and draws largely on the works of Conrad of Brundelsheim (Soccus), Abbot of Heilsbronn in 1303 (d. 1321). His mystical conceptions show a close relation to Bernard of Clairvaux and Hugo of St. Victor.

Dating

The date of the composition of the treatises is determined by these borrowings and quotations; they are written in Middle German with some traces of the Bavarian dialect.

Book of the Seven Degrees

The first, in verse, is "The Book of the Seven Degrees" (Das Buch der siben Grade), which comprises 2218 lines, and has only been preserved in one manuscript-that of Heidelberg, transcribed in 1390 by a priest, Ulric Currifex of Eschenbach. In it the author, taking as his starting point the vision of Ezechiel (xl, 22) describes the seven degrees which make the pure soul mount up to the realms of heaven: prayer, penitence, charity, the habitual thought of God, with the devotion, which purifies and which ravishes, union and conformity with God, contemplation of God. The author may have utilized a treatise of the same nature attributed to David of Augsburg.

Oldest german papermanuscript (1340) 
In 2019 an issue of "The Book of the Seven Degrees" was discovered in the Badische Landesbibliothek in Karlsruhe. Dated 1335–1340 by paper-analysis and existing watermark, the 179-page script is said to be the oldest paper manuscript fully written in german language ever found.

Liber de corpore et sanguine Domini

The other work is in prose with a prologue and epilogue in verse and it is in this prologue that the author was himself the "Monk of Heilsbronn" (einem Muniche von Hailsprunne) and asks the prayers of the reader. The title of the treatise is the "Liber de corpore et sanguine Domini" (or "Das Puch on den VI namen des Fronleichnams", or also the "Goldene Zunge").

He passes in review six different names given to the Blessed Sacrament: Eucharist, Gift, Food, Communion, Sacrifice, Sacrament; he gives the reasons for these names and suggests considerations on the Divine love, union with God, etc. (cf. supra), especially when speaking of the second and the sixth names. He cites Bernard of Clairvaux "his father", very frequently, while much less frequently Augustine of Hippo and Gregory the Great are quoted. We find the same work also in Latin translations.

Other works

A third work "On Love" (Das Puch von der Minne), if it ever existed, has not been recovered. Two other treatises which are found in the manuscript of Heidelberg have been attributed to the same author, they are "The Daughter of Sion" (Tochter Syon), a short poem of 596 lines, in the Alamannian dialect, rich in matter and full of emotion; it treats of the mystical union of the soul with God, a theme frequently dealt with in the poetry of the thirteenth and fourteenth centuries. The second work (von Sante Alexis) gives us in 456 lines the well-known legend of St. Alexis. However, peculiarities of language, rhyme, and verse, coupled with an original fashion of conceiving things (e.g. the idea of soul and spirit), forbid us to consider the "Monk of Heilsbronn" as the author of these two poems.

References

Attribution
 The entry cites:
Merzdorf, Der Mönch von Heilsbronn (Berlin, 1870); 
Wagner, Über den Mönch von Heilsbronn (Strasburg, 1876); 
Denifle in Anzeiger für deutsches Altherthum und deutsche Literatur, II (1876), 300-313; 
Birlinger in Alemannia, III (1875), 105 sqq.; 
Wimmer, Beitrage zur Kritik und Erklarung der Werke des Monchs von Heilsbronn (Kalksburg, 1895).

External links
 german Wikisource:  ADB:Mönch von Heilsbronn
 1340 Manuscript of "The Book of the Seven Degrees" : browse & download
 

14th-century writers
German Cistercians
14th-century German writers
German male writers
14th-century Latin writers